Yuvraj Vikramaditya Singh (born 5 August 1964) is an Indian businessman and politician. He was a leader of Indian National Congress (INC) and an ex-member of Jammu and Kashmir Legislative Council. He is the grandson of Maharaja Sir Hari Singh, who was the last reigning Maharaja of Jammu and Kashmir. He is the heir apparent of the Dogra dynasty.

Early life 

He is a son of senior Congress leader and former Sadr-e-Riyasat Karan Singh and Yasho Rajya Lakshmi, granddaughter of the last Rana Prime Minister of Nepal, Shree 3 Maharaja Mohan Shumsher Jang Bahadur Rana.

He was born in 1964 and is a hotelier by profession and is Managing Director of Taragarh Palace Hotel, Kangra. Vikramaditya completed his education at the University of Southern California and married Chitrangada Scindia, daughter of late Madhavrao Scindia Maharaja of Gwalior in 1987. They have two children, a son, Martand Singh and a daughter, Mriganka Singh. Vikramaditya is a trustee of J&K Dharmarth Trust that was founded by Maharaja Gulab Singh. 

In 2017, his daughter, Mriganka married Nirvan Singh, the grandson of Captain Amarinder Singh, Chief Minister of Punjab and of Patiala Royal Dynasty.

Political career 

In August 2015, he joined Jammu and Kashmir Peoples Democratic Party (PDP). In October 2017, he resigned as member of Legislative council and PDP over issue of holiday on the birthday of his grandfather Maharaja Hari Singh. He later joined INC. He was Lok Sabha INC candidate from Udhampur Loksabha constituency in 2019 where he lost to Dr Jitendra Singh of BJP .

On March 22, 2022 he tendered his resignation from the primary membership of INC citing that it was his belief that "the INC is unable to realize and reflect the sentiments and aspirations of the people of Jammu and Kashmir.

Ancestry

References

Jammu and Kashmir Peoples Democratic Party politicians
1964 births
Living people
Members of the Jammu and Kashmir Legislative Council
Dogra people
Politicians from Mumbai
Indian National Congress politicians